Blackberri (born Charles Timothy Ashmore; May 31, 1945 – December 13, 2021) was an American singer-songwriter and community activist. His music focused on issues such as civil rights, LGBT rights, and pollution. After the start of the AIDS epidemic, Blackberri worked in HIV education and prevention in Black communities.

Early life
Blackberri was born in Buffalo, New York and raised in Baltimore.

Blackberri was drafted into the U.S. Navy in 1965. He was discharged in 1966 for being gay. Blackberri stated "I was under investigation because one of my shipmates turned me in... they had evidence, they arrested me, went through my personal belongings and found incriminating letters and other things." He got stranded in New York City, washing dishes and doing drugs.

Career

Blackberri studied voice at University of Arizona and sang the blues. In Tucson, he started a rock band, Gunther Quint, with his first song "Frenchie", about a one-night stand before his discharge. While living in a feminist collective in the early 1970s, he was named Blackberri, and changed his name legally soon after.

Blackberri moved to San Francisco in 1974 and joined Breeze while busking to earn money. He dated Reiner, a blues guitar player from the East Coast. In 1975, Blackberri's performance at the Two Songmakers concert was broadcast on KQED. This was the first time gay-themed music was featured on public television in San Francisco. In 1981, he released Blackberri and Friends: Finally on his music label, Bea B. Queen. He contributed to music in the films Tongues Untied, Word Is Out: Stories of Some of Our Lives, and Looking for Langston. He performed at LGBT festivals.

During the AIDS epidemic, Blackberri shifted to community support for HIV education. He worked as a death and dying counselor at the San Francisco General Hospital AIDS Ward through the Shanti Project. He became interested in HIV prevention among the African-American LGBT community.

In 2002, he received a Lifetime Achievement AIDS Hero Award at San Francisco Candlelight Vigil. In 2017, he received the Audrey Joseph Entertainment Award from San Francisco Pride. In 2019, his song "Eat the Rich" was included in Patrick Haggerty's Lavender Country.

Personal life and death
Blackberri was a Lucumi priest who traveled to Cuba thirteen times.

He suffered a heart attack in October 2021, and died on December 13, 2021, at the Alta Bates Summit Medical Center in Oakland, California, at age 76.

See also
 List of LGBT artists
 Lists of singers

References

External links

 
 

1945 births
2021 deaths
African-American activists
20th-century African-American male singers
20th-century American LGBT people
21st-century LGBT people
African-American songwriters
American male singer-songwriters
American military personnel discharged for homosexuality
American Santeríans
Gay military personnel
American gay musicians
LGBT African Americans
Military personnel from Baltimore
Military personnel from Buffalo, New York
Musicians from Baltimore
Musicians from Buffalo, New York
Singer-songwriters from California
Singer-songwriters from New York (state)
Singers from San Francisco
United States Navy sailors
University of Arizona alumni
Singer-songwriters from Maryland
African-American United States Navy personnel